Raoul II de Tosny seigneur de Conches-en-Ouche (1027 - died 9 April 1102) was a Norman nobleman of the House of Tosny, son of Roger I of Tosny and older brother of Robert de Stafford / Tosny. He was active in Normandy, England and Wales.

Hastings in 1066
He is one of the few proven companions of William the Conqueror known to have fought at the Battle of Hastings in 1066. Tradition says he gave up the role of standard bearer, his hereditary office, to Walter Giffard, in order to be able to fight closer to William, duke of Normandy.

Feud
Raoul became embroiled in a feud with William, Count of Évreux due to a disagreement between William's wife Helvise de Nevers and his wife, Isabel. This came to open war in 1091–92, when William attacked Conches. A settlement was reached. They later co-operated in attacking Robert de Beaumont, 1st Earl of Leicester's county of Meulan.

Raoul had widely spread holdings, his seat was at Flamstead in Hertfordshire, while he held lands in western Gloucestershire. He was granted  Clifford Castle, and it is also believed that he held assets in the village of Hose, Leicestershire, which was split into two manors, Tosny's and that of the title holder of the Norman Belvoir Castle.

Family
Raoul married Isabel de Montfort, daughter of Simon I de Montfort. They had:
Roger, died young.
Raoul IV de Conches, married Alice of Huntingdon, daughter of Waltheof, Earl of Northumbria, and Judith of Lens.
Godehilde married Baldwin I of Jerusalem Other sources also say she married Robert de Neubourg, son of Henry de Beaumont, 1st Earl of Warwick - William of Jumièges mentions this marriage and states that she was the daughter of 'Raoul II' de Tosny. Perhaps she married both men, unless William of Jumièges and others have made a mistake

Notes

References

Sources

1102 deaths
Anglo-Normans in Wales
Companions of William the Conqueror
Norman warriors
People from Flamstead
Year of birth unknown